Laker Radio is an internet radio station in Sault Ste. Marie, Michigan, United States. Broadcasting a college radio format, The 46th Parallel Radio is the campus radio station of the city's Lake Superior State University, and also provides mobile DJ services for on-campus and Sault Ste. Marie events. From 1993–2017, the station broadcast at 90.1 on the FM dial with the call sign WLSO, before becoming solely an internet radio station during the 2016–2017 school year.

The station originally launched in 1991 under the unofficial callsign WLKR, as an AM carrier current station broadcasting exclusively to the LSSU campus. After receiving a broadcasting license from the Federal Communications Commission, the station launched on FM in 1993, when they adopted the WLSO call sign. Following a listener contest earlier that year, WLSO rebranded as The 46th Parallel Radio in August 2016, and launched a new internet streaming format through the Intercollegiate Broadcasting System and Backbone Networks. Lake Superior State University relinquished its FCC license as of November 2, 2017, having already taken the 90.1 FM signal dark earlier that year, with most social media accounts ceasing updates in the process.

In the fall of 2019, The 46th Parallel Radio's Instagram and Twitter pages resumed active posting after a 3-year hiatus, promoting on-campus events and an impending search for new DJs. In March 2021, the station rebranded again to Laker Radio, and closed their Backbone Networks station in favor of a brand new internet station via Live365.

While largely a freeform college radio station, The 46th Parallel has traditionally featured student DJs hosting their own programs and custom playlists, as well as school faculty and non-students at times.  Notably, general music rotation on WLSO leaned towards adult album alternative music in its later years on FM, while the station has also aired Lake Superior State Lakers games and coverage in the past. Central Michigan University in Mount Pleasant also simulcasts their own radio station to the Sault Ste. Marie market at WCMZ-FM, though they air a public radio and jazz format.

Studio
Laker Radio's studios are located in the basement of the Cisler Center.  The studio was moved there from Brady Hall in 2006 to be more visible in the campus community and easier to access by students. The studio consists of management offices, a recording booth, and the on-air broadcast studio.

The station broadcasts 24 hours a day, 7 days a week year-round.  Laker Radio runs on automation whenever there is no live show in the studio, which usually occurs at night and over breaks.

Laker Radio has recently undertaken remote broadcasting.  The station currently broadcasts live from student government meetings, concerts, and open-mic nights on campus. The studio has a 40-second broadcast delay as well as phone patch to take calls and put them on the air.

Transmitter
The station's transmitter site was moved in October 2007.  It was formerly located in the old studio, in the east basement of Brady Hall.  It was relocated to another location in Brady Hall where it was re-engineered and re-built.

Laker Radio operates two transmitters.  The primary transmitter is a R.V.R. TEX-300-LCD installed in March 2008.  The original, now a backup transmitter, consists of a Bext TEX-20-NV exciter and a separate Bext PJ-200 power amplifier. The station's antenna system is on the roof of Brady Hall.  It is a 2-bay circularly-polarized radiator. Programming is sent to the transmission site utilizing the Tele-Link Studio Transmitter Link (STL) from Energy-Onix.

Laker Radio utilizes Sine System's Remote Facilities Controller (RFC-1) at the transmitter site.  It allows for remote and automatic controls, system monitoring and acts as an alarm system calling station engineers immediately in the event of a system fault. Laker Radio's RFC-1 monitors 24 channels of telemetry and logs all data though GetTelemetry software.

Laker Radio also uses as an Orban Optimod 8200-FM audio processor connected to a controlling computer at the transmitter. Laker Radio's air signal is continually monitored by an Inovonics FM modulation analyzer model 531 and received audio is sent back to the studio to be checked. All equipment is protected through a Polyphazor lighting-arrestor and several back-up power supplies, allowing uninterrupted broadcasts and relaying notifications from the Emergency Alert System (EAS) to the community in the event of a power disruption or other emergency.

References

External links 
Official website (archived on March 14th, 2017)

Michiguide.com - WLSO History

LSO
LSO
Lake Superior State University
Radio stations established in 1991
1991 establishments in Michigan
Internet radio stations in the United States
Defunct radio stations in the United States
Radio stations disestablished in 2020